Pavel Shumanov (Bulgarian: Павел Шуманов; born 14 November 1968) is a Bulgarian former cyclist.

Major results

1989
 1st Stage 4 Peace Race
1990
 1st Overall Tour of Bulgaria
1992
 1st Overall Tour of Bulgaria
 2nd Overall Tour of Romania
1996
 1st Stage 4 Hessen-Rundfahrt
 2nd Giro del Medio Brenta
1997
 1st Overall Tour of Bulgaria
1998
 3rd Overall Tour of Slovenia
2005
 3rd National Time Trial Championships
2006
 1st Stage 4 Tour of Greece
 1st Overall Tour of Romania
 2nd National Time Trial Championships
 3rd National Road Race Championships
2007
 1st Stage 6 Tour of Romania
 2nd Overall Tour of Bulgaria
1st Stage 5
 3rd National Time Trial Championships
2008
 1st Grand Prix Bourgas
 1st Stage 5 Tour of Romania
 3rd Overall Paths of King Nikola
2009
 1st  National Time Trial Championships
 3rd Overall Tour of Romania
2010
 2nd National Time Trial Championships

References

1968 births
Living people
Bulgarian male cyclists
Sportspeople from Sliven